is a village located in Aomori Prefecture, Japan. ,  the village had an estimated population of 1270 in 548 households, and a population density of 5.2 persons per km2.

Geography
Nishimeya is located in the far southern edge of Aomori Prefecture, bordering Akita Prefecture and the Shirakami-Sanchi mountain range, south of Mount Iwaki. The Iwaki River flows through the village, and the Tsugaru Dam and Lake Miyama are located in the center of the village. A portion of the Akaishi Keiryū Anmon no Taki Prefectural Natural Park is located in Nishimeya. The mountainous area is home to many indigenous plant and animal species. Wildlife includes Japanese macaque monkeys, kamoshika, tanuki and Asian black bears.

Neighbouring municipalities
Aomori Prefecture
Hirosaki
Ajigasawa
Akita Prefecture
Ōdate
Fujisato

Climate
The village has cold humid continental climate (Köppen Dfb) characterized by warm short summers and long cold winters with heavy snowfall. The average annual temperature in Nishimeya is 10.0 °C. The average annual rainfall is 1423 mm with September as the wettest month. The temperatures are highest on average in August, at around 23.6 °C, and lowest in January, at around -2.3 °C.

Demographics
Per Japanese census data, the population of Nishimeya has decreased by more than half over the past 40 years and is considerably less than it was a century ago.

History
The area around Nishimeya was controlled by the Tsugaru clan of Hirosaki Domain during the Edo period. It became a village in Nakatsugaru District on April 1, 1898, with the establishment of the modern municipalities system after the start of the Meiji period.

Government
Nishimeya has a mayor-council form of government with a directly elected mayor and a unicameral village legislature of six members. Nishimiya is included with the city of Hirosaki, which contributes six members to the Aomori Prefectural Assembly. In terms of national politics, the village is part of Aomori 3rd district of the lower house of the Diet of Japan.

Economy
The economy of Nishimeya is heavily dependent on agriculture and forestry.

Education
Nishimeya has one public elementary school operated by village town government. The village does not have a junior high school or a high school.

Transportation

Railway
The village does not have any passenger railway service. The nearest train station is Hirosaki Station on the JR East Ōu Main Line and Konan Railway Konan Line.

Highway
The village is not located on  any national highway.

Sister city relations
 - Yehe Manchu Autonomous Banner, Lishu County, Jilin, People's Republic of China,

Local attractions
Shirakami-Sanchi, a UNESCO World Heritage Site
Akaishi Keiryū Anmon no Taki Prefectural Natural Park

References

External links

 

Villages in Aomori Prefecture